Cebeci railway station is a railway station in Ankara, Turkey, on the Başkentray commuter rail line, part of the Turkish State Railways network.  Cebeci railway station was put into service in 1972 and became a stop of the Sincan-Kayaş commuter rail line.  The station was closed in 2016 and then demolished, it started its reconstruction in 2017 and opened on April 12, 2018.

References

Railway stations in Ankara Province
Railway stations opened in 1972